The 140th Battalion (St. John's Tigers), CEF was a unit in the Canadian Expeditionary Force during the First World War.  Based in Saint John, New Brunswick, the unit began recruiting in late 1915 throughout New Brunswick.  After sailing to England in September 1916, the battalion was absorbed into the 13th Reserve Battalion and The Royal Canadian Regiment and Princess Patricia's Canadian Light Infantry Depots in November 1916.  The 140th Battalion (St. John's Tigers),  CEF had one Officer Commanding: Lieut-Col. L. H. Beer.

The 140th Battalion is perpetuated by The Royal New Brunswick Regiment.

References

Meek, John F. Over the Top! The Canadian Infantry in the First World War. Orangeville, Ont.: The Author, 1971.

Military units and formations of New Brunswick
Battalions of the Canadian Expeditionary Force
Carleton and York Regiment
Royal New Brunswick Regiment